The Tower of Vallitone is a tower in Corsica.

See also
List of Genoese towers in Corsica

Notes and references

Towers in Corsica